A mega ramp, or megaramp, is the informal name given to any large-format vert ramp structure, often used in skateboarding and freestyle BMX.   The name distinguishes a second generation of ramps which became increasingly popular during the 1990s-2000s transition years.  They are so called to distinguish them from the more modest classic ramps used throughout the preceding decades of these sports and which were, at most, half-scale versions of these newer and larger ramps.

MegaRamp (styled with title caps and without a space) is the name of a mega ramp event organization and promotion company.

Structure

Contemporary structures are generally constructed of metal scaffold with a wood surface topped with Skatelite, and consist of two or three sections.  The most common ramp setup, used as well by MegaRamp, is a sequence of three mega ramp sections; a roll-in, a gap jump, and a vert quarter pipe.  Vert half-pipe mega ramps have been built in the past, but they are uncommon.

The roll-in section consists of a single or multiple roll-ins that drop from 12m (40') or higher up.  The purpose of the roll-in is for the athletes to be able to gain the speed needed to tackle the other sections of the ramp. A 60-foot tall megaramp is located at the home of professional skateboarder Bob Burnquist.

The second section can be a gap jump, or a quarter pipe, though the gap jump option has become the most popular setup.   Gap jumps range in distance from 7.5m (25') to 21m (70') between the launch and landing sections.  The athletes clear the distance between the launch and landing sections of the gap jump by sailing through the air above the gap, and land on the landing section, which is sloped forward to decrease the landing impact.

The third section is almost invariably a quarter pipe.
The quarter pipes can be 5.4m (18') or greater in height and serve as either a speed brake, or as another launch point from which the athlete sails directly vertical into the air off the top lip of the ramp, before falling back down and landing on the quarter pipe transition again.

Other additions and modifications have been tried on mega ramps, such as the tall flatbox with a rainbow rail that was added to the Point X mega ramp.

The total length of these structures varies from approximately 60m (200') to 108m (360') in length.

History
The first such giant ramp structure was conceived and built by BMX freestyler Mathew "Mat" Hoffman in his Oklahoma home backyard between 1991 and 1992. It was a single 6.3m (21') tall vert quarter pipe ramp, with no roll-in ramp, from which Mat would launch and air after being towed into at speed by a motorcycle. In such way, in 1992 Mat set the Freestyle BMX air record at approximately 7.05m (23.5'). Mat later went on to build a full vert half-pipe ramp with similar dimensions, including a 12m high roll-in ramp from the top of the roof of his warehouse.

Danny Way thought up the now common "MegaRamp" setup, a specific type of giant ramp arrangement consisting of the roll-in ramp, the gap jumps, and the final quarter pipe ramp.  This setup was first seen at Point X Camp in the OP King Of Skate pay-per-view special in 2002.  It was introduced again and was officially called the MegaRamp in the 2003 DC Shoes video release "The DC Video", where Way set two world records in the same run - Longest jump (75 ft) and highest air (23.5 ft).

In 2005, Way used a MegaRamp again to jump the Great Wall of China and became the first person to jump the wall without the help of a motor vehicle and land successfully. This was also the largest ramp structure ever built.  After one practice attempt, he landed the jump across the gap over the Wall four times in front of a crowd of Chinese dignitaries and officials, along with his family, friends, and thousands of locals.

In 2012, Tom Schaar used a mega ramp to land the first-ever 1080, breaking Tony Hawk’s record 900 (landed on a vert ramp) set in 1999.

In August 2019, Mitchie Brusco used a mega ramp to land the first-ever 1260, breaking Schaar’s record.

MegaRamp at the X Games

The MegaRamp has been employed in competition at the X Games, where it is called "Big Air", since X Games X in 2004 for skateboard and 2006 for BMX. In 2007 Jake Brown fell 45 feet to the bottom of the ramp.

See also

Vert ramp
Mini ramp
Half-pipe
Quarter pipe

References

External links
 Danny Way breaks the records for longest jump and highest in the same run
 megaskateboard

Aggressive skating
Skateboarding equipment